Kaidi is an Estonian given name, a variant of Katariina.

People named Kaidi include:
 Kaidi Jekimova, Estonian footballer
 Kaidi Kivioja, Estonian triathlete

See also
Kaidi Finland

Estonian feminine given names